Minillas is one of the 40 subbarrios of Santurce, in the municipality of San Juan, Puerto Rico.

Demographics

In 2000, Minillas had a population of 1,484.

In 2010, Minillas had a population of 1,039 and a population density of 12,987.5 persons per square mile.

During the summer of 2010, some of its construction sites were utilized as shooting locations for the film Fast Five from the Fast and the Furious series starring Vin Diesel and Tego Calderón.

See also
 
 List of communities in Puerto Rico

References

Santurce, San Juan, Puerto Rico
Municipality of San Juan